Maite Aranburu Olabarrieta is a Spanish Basque politician who served in the Basque Parliament from 2005 until 2009, representing the Biscay constituency as a member of the Communist Party of the Basque Homelands.

Biography 
Maite Aranburu Olabarrieta, a web manager and the leader of the Communist Party of the Basque Homelands (EHAK), was elected to the Basque Parliament following the 2005 Basque regional election. Elected to represent the Biscay constituency, she campaigned on a pro-independence platform, vowed to give a voice to the recently banned political party Batasuna, and refused to condemn the terrorist activities of ETA. Eight other EHAK candidates were also elected, a "surprise" performance for the recently formed party.

In parliament, Aranburu sat as a member of the Left Nationalist Group and was a member of the Committee on Women and Youth. EHAK was officially banned in 2008, forcing Aranburu and the other deputies to sit as members of a different party. Aranburu left parliament in 2009. Later that year, Aranburu was forced to testify before a judge of the  who was investigating the relationship between EHAK "with the alleged crimes of collaboration with a terrorist organization, illegal association, fraud of subsidies and embezzlement of public funds ... to contribute to the activity and allegedly terrorist purposes of Batasuna-ETA".

References 

Year of birth missing (living people)
Place of birth missing (living people)
Members of the 8th Basque Parliament
Women members of the Basque Parliament
Basque women in politics
21st-century Spanish women politicians
Communist Party of the Basque Homelands politicians
Living people